Seneca East High School is a public high school in Attica, Ohio. It is the only high school in the Seneca East Local School District. On December 1, 2011, Carey, Mohawk, and Seneca East announced they would be leaving the MAL to help form the new Northern 10 Athletic Conference in 2014 with Bucyrus, Buckeye Central, Colonel Crawford, Crestline, Riverdale, Wynford and Ridgedale. (The Northern 10 only consist of 8 teams, starting in 2021 sports seasons, with Ridgedale & Riverdale leaving the league in 2020.)

Ohio High School Athletic Association State Championships

 Girls Cross Country – 1998 
 Boys Cross Country - 2012

References

External links
 District Website

High schools in Seneca County, Ohio
Public high schools in Ohio
Public middle schools in Ohio
Public elementary schools in Ohio